There were two national elections in France in 2017,

 2017 French presidential election in April–May
 2017 French legislative election in June